The Galway Junior A Hurling Championship (known for sponsorship reasons as the Brooks Galway Junior A Hurling Championship and abbreviated to the Galway JAHC) is an annual hurling competition organised by the Galway County Board of the Gaelic Athletic Association and contested by the top-ranking junior clubs in the county of Galway in Ireland. It is the third tier overall in the entire Galway hurling championship system.

Ballygar are the title holders, beating Skehana/Mountbellew-Moylough by 1-17 to 1-16 in the 2022 final.

Roll of honour

List of finals

References

External links
Official Galway Website

1
Junior hurling county championships